Thor: The Dark World (Original Motion Picture Soundtrack) is the film score for the Marvel Studios film, Thor: The Dark World by Brian Tyler, which was released by Hollywood Records in Europe on October 28, 2013. The album was released digitally in the United States on November 5, followed by a CD release on November 12, 2013. It is the first soundtrack in the Marvel Cinematic Universe to feature the "Marvel Studios Fanfare". All music was performed by the Philharmonia Orchestra of London and the London Philharmonic Orchestra. Vocals were performed by Tori Letzler.

Background
In March 2013, it was announced that Carter Burwell had signed on to score Thor: The Dark World following Patrick Doyle who scored the first Thor film. The following May, Burwell departed the film due to creative differences. Kevin Feige, president of production at Marvel Studios explained, "It just didn't seem like the right fit, and we had to make a call early on. If post-production had been a year-and-a-half, we might have had time for trial and error, it might have worked." On June 18, 2013, Brian Tyler took over scoring duties; Tyler previously scored Iron Man 3. Tyler said, "The feel of Thor is a very different than Iron Man. Yet they live in the same universe. For me, it's like somehow Indiana Jones showed up on the Enterprise; or something."

Track listing
All music composed by Brian Tyler

References

2013 soundtrack albums
2010s film soundtrack albums
Marvel Cinematic Universe: Phase Two soundtracks
Thor (film series)
Intrada Records soundtracks
Brian Tyler soundtracks